Boniek Manuel Gomes Forbes (born 30 September 1983) is a footballer who plays as a winger for Cheshunt. He played for Leyton Orient in the Football League. He received his first name Boniek after famous Polish international player Zbigniew Boniek.

References

External links

1983 births
Living people
English footballers
Association football wingers
English Football League players
Leyton Orient F.C. players
Redbridge F.C. players
Chelmsford City F.C. players
Heybridge Swifts F.C. players
Hornchurch F.C. players
Bishop's Stortford F.C. players
Thurrock F.C. players
Enfield Town F.C. players
East Thurrock United F.C. players
Cheshunt F.C. players
Brimsdown Rovers F.C. players